Bennie Gordon Thompson (born January 28, 1948) is an American politician serving as the U.S. representative for  since 1993. A member of the Democratic Party, Thompson served as the chair of the Committee on Homeland Security from 2019 to 2023 and from 2007 to 2011. He was both the first Democrat and the first African American to chair the committee. He is the dean of Mississippi's congressional delegation.

Since 2011, Thompson has been the only Democrat in Mississippi's congressional delegation. His district includes most of Jackson and is the only majority-black district in the state. The Mississippi Delta comprises the vast majority of the district.

Early life, education, and career
Thompson was born in Bolton, Mississippi, the son of Will Thompson and Annie (Lauris) Thompson. He attended Hinds County public schools and graduated from Hinds County Agricultural High School. He then attended Tougaloo College, from which he earned a Bachelor of Arts in political science in 1968. He earned a Master of Science in educational administration from Jackson State University in 1972. Thompson was a schoolteacher in Madison, Mississippi. He served as an alderman (1969–1973) and then mayor of Bolton (1973–1980) before being elected to the Hinds County Board of Supervisors, on which he served from 1980 to 1993.

U.S. House of Representatives

Tenure
With five other Democrats splitting the vote, he finished second, behind Republican Hayes Dent with 28% of the vote in the March 30, 1993, primary election. He then defeated Dent in the April 13 runoff with 55% of the vote. He won the seat again in 1994 and has been reelected 12 times. He has faced serious opposition only twice, when journalist Clinton LeSueur held him to 55% in 2002 and 58% in 2004.

Thompson became an outspoken advocate for the Gulf Coast after Hurricanes Katrina and Rita hit in 2005. From his position on the Homeland Security Committee, he pushed for accountability at the Federal Emergency Management Agency (FEMA) and a careful review of the role of the Red Cross in the time of disaster. He also pursued waste, fraud, and abuse in hurricane contracting and called for preferences to be given to small and Gulf Coast businesses in the recovery and rebuilding of the affected states. Thompson is the founding member of the bipartisan Gulf Coast Recovery & Rebuilding Caucus in the House of Representatives.

Thompson's voting record has been decidedly liberal; he is by far the most liberal member of the Mississippi delegation and arguably one of the most liberal congressmen ever to represent the state. He is a founding member of the Congressional Progressive Caucus. His legislative platform focuses mainly on homeland security, civil rights, agriculture and rural issues, equal education, and health care reform. In 1975, he became one of the original plaintiffs in the Ayers Case, which concerned the adequate funding of predominantly black educational institutes in Mississippi. In 2000, Thompson wrote legislation that created the National Center for Minority Health and Health Care Disparities.

During his tenure as chairman of the Homeland Security Committee, Thompson focused on assuring that state and local officials, as well as first responders (fire, police, EMTs), got the resources they needed to protect their communities. Thompson was particularly concerned about local officials getting adequate resources, having been a volunteer firefighter and a local elected official for 24 years.

Thompson was one of 31 House Democrats to object to the certification of the results of the 2004 presidential election in Ohio. President George W. Bush won Ohio, the state the representatives objected to counting, by 118,457 votes. Democrats claimed the results were tainted by irregularities or fraud. These claims were investigated and rejected by journalists, and Democratic nominee John Kerry, who did not contest the election result. As of 2021, Thompson stands by his vote, claiming it was "based on what the issues are at that time. But again, I didn't tear up the place because I cast a vote."

Along with John Conyers, in April 2006 Thompson brought an action against George W. Bush and others alleging violations of the Constitution in the passing of the Deficit Reduction Act of 2005. The case, Conyers v. Bush, was ultimately dismissed.

On January 5, 2007, Thompson introduced H.R.1, "Implementing the 9/11 Commission Recommendations Act of 2007", the first bill of the 110th Congress. The bill, cosponsored by more than 100 House Members, provided for the implementation of the 9/11 Commission's remaining recommendations. It included provisions requiring major improvements in aviation security, border security, and infrastructure security; providing first responders the equipment and training they need; beefing up efforts to prevent terrorists from acquiring weapons of mass destruction; and significantly expanding diplomatic, economic, educational, and other strategies designed to counter terrorism. The bill had bipartisan support and passed 299–128 on January 9, 2007. On July 27, 2007, the Conference Report on H.R. 1 passed the House overwhelmingly, 371–40. The previous day, it had passed the Senate 85–8. The President signed H.R. 1 into law on August 3, 2007.

With the passage of H.R. 1, Thompson is the first African-American Chairman of a House Committee to have a House–Senate Conference on the first bill introduced in either the House or the Senate in any given Congress.

On December 27, 2009, commenting on reports that Umar Farouk Abdulmutallab, who had allegedly tried to set off a suicide bomb on Northwest Airlines Flight 253 on December 25, 2009, had subsequently confessed to being trained and equipped in Yemen,
Thompson called for a halt to all current plans with regard to Yemen in light of Abdulmutullab's ties there, including plans to repatriate approximately 80 Yemeni captives in Guantanamo.

Thompson is a supporter, and one of the proposers of, a bill to prevent auto insurance companies from using credit scores to set their rates, which supporters claim would lower rates for Americans in financial struggle. The bill proposed that auto insurance rates be based solely on factors related to "skills and responsibility behind the wheel", excluding factors such as debt or poor credit elsewhere. The bill has not been enacted.

Thompson has also been a supporter of a measure to increase screening and background checks for pilot trainees to reduce chances of terrorist exploitation. The bill, H.R. 6159, would require all applicants to go through a waiting period while they are screened and cleared by the Department of Homeland Security. Currently, only foreign-born trainees are required to go through this screening. The bill has not been enacted.

In July 2014, Thompson joined Senator Ron Wyden in introducing a bill to limit the number of documents that are classified and to overhaul the security clearance system. The bill stalled and was not passed.

On April 1, 2020, Thompson and other Democratic lawmakers on the House Homeland Security Committee introduced legislation that would create a commission tasked with "producing a full and complete accounting of the nation's preparedness and response to the coronavirus". He compared this to the 9/11 Commission, saying, "while we don't yet know the full impact the coronavirus will have on the nation," already "more Americans have been killed by the virus than died in the September 11, 2001, attacks". A bipartisan group of House lawmakers would appoint 25 commission members, and 18 months after its initial meeting, a "public report detailing recommendations for the development of a national plan to address public health and the economic and social impacts of future pandemics" would be published.

For his tenure as the chairman of the House Homeland Security Committee in the 116th Congress, Thompson earned an "A" grade from the non-partisan Lugar Center's Congressional Oversight Hearing Index.

On March 3, 2021, Thompson was the only House Democrat to vote against the For the People Act, a top legislative priority of House Democrats that would reform campaign finance and election laws and expand voting rights. Despite initially cosponsoring the bill, Thompson said his vote "was no accident", explaining, "My constituents opposed the redistricting portion of the bill as well as the section on public finances. I always listen and vote in the interest of my constituents."

Negotiating the January 6 Commission and chairing the Select Committee 
On January 7, 2021, Thompson issued a statement about the January 6 United States Capitol attack. In the statement, he wrote, "There must be a thorough Congressional investigation into the clear and massive breakdowns in preparedness and response. My Committee has been examining the threat from domestic terrorism, right-wing extremism, and white nationalism for ten years and this will be at the top of our agenda for the new Congress."

On February 13, Speaker Nancy Pelosi announced plans for a bicameral commission to investigate the attack on the Capitol, modeled after the National Commission on Terrorist Attacks Upon the United States (9/11 Commission), an independent panel that investigated the attacks of September 11, 2001. The 9/11 Commission was created in 2002 by Congress and issued a detailed report on its findings 15 months later. Pelosi and Minority Leader Kevin McCarthy tasked Thompson and John Katko, the House Homeland Security Committee's highest-ranking members, with negotiating the commission's establishment resolution. Despite initial bipartisan support for a commission, by March, disputes between Democrats and Republicans over the proposed investigation's scope and whether the commission would have an equal number of members from each party stalled the commission's creation.

On May 14, 2021, Thompson and Katko announced H.R. 3233, The National Commission to Investigate the January 6 Attack on the United States Capitol Complex Act. The resolution introduced to the House on May 19 met all Republican objections; it contained an equal number of members from each party, required approval of both parties to issue subpoenas, and set a firm deadline of December 31, 2021, to complete the report. The bill to form the commission passed the House, 252–175, with 35 Republicans and every Democrat supporting it. On May 28, Senate Republicans used a filibuster to block taking up the bill. Thompson issued a statement denouncing Senate Republicans, calling it appalling that Mitch McConnell allowed the bill to be filibustered even after hearing from Officer Brian Sicknick's mother and her support for the bill.

On July 1, 2021, Speaker Nancy Pelosi chose Thompson to chair the United States House Select Committee on the January 6 Attack. As chair, Thompson has the sole authority to sign and issue a subpoena. According to a Congressional Research Service survey, this is the only active House committee with this authorization, found under Section 5: Procedures in H.Res 503, as most House committees can issue and authorize subpoenas only with a majority vote of the committee/subcommittee or by consulting the ranking minority member. Most House committees can have a member designated by the committee to authorize subpoenas.

Committee assignments 
 Committee on Homeland Security (chair)
 As chair of the committee, Thompson may serve as an ex officio member of all subcommittees.
 Select Committee on the January 6 Attack (chair)

Caucus memberships
 Congressional Black Caucus
 Congressional Gaming Caucus
 Congressional Rural Caucus
 Congressional Sunbelt Caucus
 Renewable Energy & Energy Efficiency Caucus
 Congressional Travel & Tourism Caucus
 Tennessee Valley Authority Caucus
 Congressional Children's Working Group
 National Guard & Reserve Components Congressional Members Organization
 Afterschool Caucuses

Legislation sponsored
 Aviation Security Stakeholder Participation Act of 2013 (H.R. 1204; 113th Congress) – Thompson introduced this bill on March 14, 2013. If it became law, the bill would direct the Transportation Security Administration to establish in the TSA an Aviation Security Advisory Committee and consult with it about matters of aviation security.
 Thompson is also supporting a bill to prevent sleeping in United States Congress offices.

Electoral history

National politics
Thompson was the Permanent Chair of the 2020 Democratic National Convention.

On February 16, 2021, on behalf of Thompson, the National Association for the Advancement of Colored People (NAACP) filed a federal lawsuit accusing Donald Trump of inciting violence on January 6 at the U.S. Capitol assault. The suit came three days after Trump was acquitted in the second Senate impeachment trial for inciting the riot. After the acquittal, Republican Senate Leader Mitch McConnell said in a speech he voted to acquit Trump because he believes the Senate cannot try a former president, but encouraged litigation against Trump, saying: "We have a criminal justice system in this country. We have civil litigation. And former presidents are not immune from being accountable by either one." Included in the lawsuit as defendants are Trump's personal lawyer Rudy Giuliani, and the two organizations the Proud Boys and Oath Keepers. The lawsuit alleges that, by preventing Congress "by the use of force, intimidation, and threat" from carrying out its constitutional duties, the 2021 United States Electoral College vote count, Trump, Giuliani and the hate groups violated the 1871 Third Enforcement Act (also known as the Ku Klux Klan Act).

According to Thompson's friends and advisors, his national security expertise qualifies him to lead the Select Committee on the January 6 Attack.

Personal life
Thompson is married to London Johnson of Mound Bayou, Mississippi, and has a daughter, BendaLonne, a granddaughter, Jeanna, and a grandson, Thomas. He is a member of Kappa Alpha Psi fraternity (Gamma Rho – Tougaloo College) and a lifetime member of the Asbury United Methodist Church in Bolton.

See also
 List of African-American United States representatives
 Final Report of the Task Force on Combating Terrorist and Foreign Fighter Travel

References

External links

 Congressman Bennie G. Thompson official U.S. House website
 Bennie G. Thompson for Congress
 

 

|-

|-

|-

|-

|-

1948 births
21st-century American politicians
African-American mayors in Mississippi
African-American members of the United States House of Representatives
African-American people in Mississippi politics
American United Methodists
Methodists from Mississippi
American Methodists
County supervisors in Mississippi
Democratic Party members of the United States House of Representatives from Mississippi
Living people
Jackson State University alumni
Mayors of places in Mississippi
People from Bolton, Mississippi
Tougaloo College alumni
21st-century African-American politicians
20th-century African-American people